John Lawrence "Joel" Patten II (born February 7, 1958 in Augsburg, West Germany) is a former professional football player who played tackle for seven seasons in the National Football League: for the Cleveland Browns in 1980, Indianapolis Colts in 1987-1988, San Diego Chargers in 1989-1990, and Los Angeles Raiders in 1991-1992. He also played all 3 seasons of the USFL with the Washington Federals in 1983-1984 & Orlando Renegades in 1985.

Since retiring as a player, Joel has remained active in professional football. He has held several scouting jobs, including two stints with the Washington Redskins. He has also worked with the Houston Texans and St. Louis Rams. He worked as director of college scouting for the San Francisco 49ers and was promoted to director of player personnel on May 1, 2013.

The son of a U.S. Army officer, Patten played high school football and basketball at Robinson Secondary School in Fairfax, Virginia, where he graduated in 1976.  He played his college football at Duke University in Durham, North Carolina, where he played tight end and offensive tackle, and graduated in 1980.

References

External links
Fanbase.com - Joel Patten

American football offensive tackles
Duke Blue Devils football players
Cleveland Browns players
Indianapolis Colts players
San Diego Chargers players
Los Angeles Raiders players
Washington Federals/Orlando Renegades players
1958 births
Living people
Robinson Secondary School alumni